The Illibuck Trophy is the centerpiece of an American college football rivalry between the Illinois Fighting Illini football team of the University of Illinois and Ohio State Buckeyes football team of Ohio State University, with the winner of their game receiving said trophy.

History

The Illibuck is a carved wooden turtle that serves as the trophy awarded to the winner of the game. Two junior honorary societies, Bucket and Dipper of Ohio State and Atius-Sachem of Illinois, are responsible for the care of the Illibuck. Originally the "trophy" was a live turtle when the tradition began in 1925, picked for its expected long life as a symbol of the anticipated long life of the rivalry. From 1919 to 1933, the Illinois–Ohio State game was the regular-season finale for both teams. Since the original turtle's death on April 14, 1926, ten wooden replica Illibucks have been carved, each with the scores from games on its back. The Illibuck is the second oldest trophy passed between Big Ten Conference football programs (the Little Brown Jug was created in 1903).

The rivalry once included the smoking of a "peace pipe" between members of the two junior honorary societies, which occurred at halftime of the game. This practice has not been done for many years. However, the trophy is still presented to the winning school of the previous year's contest between quarters.

The series was temporarily interrupted during the 2003 and 2004 seasons when Ohio State and Illinois did not play each other. When the teams met in 2005, Illinois presented the trophy to Ohio State for winning the 2002 game. Ohio State leads the overall series 68–30–4 and the trophy series 63–23–2.

In 2011, the Big Ten expanded to 12 teams and split into two divisions. Ohio State and Illinois were both placed in the Leaders Division, meaning they would play each other every year. But in 2014, the league expanded to accommodate the addition of Maryland and Rutgers, which placed Illinois in the West Division and Ohio State in the East Division. An annual matchup between the schools will no longer happen with this format, although the teams are guaranteed to meet .

Game results
Years of an Illinois victory are in blue. 
Years of an Ohio State victory are in scarlet. 
Years of a tie are in grey while vacated victories by either team are in white.

See also 
 List of NCAA college football rivalry games
 List of most-played college football series in NCAA Division I

References

College football rivalries in the United States
College football rivalry trophies in the United States
Ohio State Buckeyes football
Ohio State University Spirit and Traditions
Illinois Fighting Illini football
Big Ten Conference rivalries